is the 44th single by Japanese entertainer Akina Nakamori. Written by Kim Hyung-seok and Gorō Matsui, the single was released on July 7, 2004, by Utahime Records.

Background 
Like Nakamori's previous single "Akai Hana", "Hajimete Deatta Hi no Yō ni" is a Japanese-language cover of South Korean singer Park Yong-ha's 2003 single "Cheoeum Geu Nalcheoleom" (처음 그 날처럼, lit. "Like the First Day"). The difference is that it has alternate Japanese lyrics by veteran lyricist Matsui. This marked the second time Nakamori released two versions of the same song as singles, after "Meu amor é..." and "Akaitori Nigeta" in 1986. "Hajimete Deatta Hi no Yō ni" was used as the theme song of NHK BS2's Japanese dub of the Korean drama series All In.

Chart performance 
"Hajimete Deatta Hi no Yō ni" peaked at No. 50 on Oricon's weekly singles chart and sold over 6,200 copies.

Track listing

Charts

References

External links 
 
 

2004 singles
2004 songs
Akina Nakamori songs
Japanese-language songs
Songs with lyrics by Gorō Matsui
Universal Music Japan singles